Cecil James Hare (March 2, 1919 – April 15, 1963) was an American football running back in the National Football League for the Washington Redskins and New York Giants.  His brother Ray Hare also played in the NFL.  Hare played college football at Gonzaga University.

External links
 Database Football
 

1919 births
1963 deaths
Gridiron football people from Saskatchewan
Canadian players of American football
American football running backs
United States Navy personnel of World War II
Washington Redskins players
New York Giants players
United States Navy officers
United States Navy reservists